Lasionycta corax is a moth of the family Noctuidae. It is found in the Upper Kolyma River area in Russia.

External links
A Revision Of The Lasionycta Skraelingia (Herrich-Schäffer) Species Complex (Lepidoptera: Noctuidae)

Lasionycta
Moths described in 1988